Hope Collection may refer to:

 The Hope Entomological Collections of Frederick William Hope at the Oxford University Museum of Natural History
 The Hope Collection of Pictures
 The Hope Collection formerly at Deepdene House and Gardens